Mie ayam, mi ayam, or bakmi ayam (Indonesian for 'chicken bakmi', literally chicken noodles) is a common Indonesian dish of seasoned yellow wheat noodles topped with diced chicken meat (ayam). It is derived from culinary techniques employed in Chinese cuisine. In Indonesia, the dish is recognized as a popular Chinese Indonesian dish, served from simple travelling vendor carts frequenting residential areas, humble street-side warung to restaurants.

Preparation and serving 
The yellow wheat noodle is boiled in water until it achieves an al dente texture and mixed in a bowl with cooking oil, soy sauce, and garlic. The oil coats the noodle in order to separate the threads. The oil can be chicken fat, lard, or vegetable oil. The chicken meat is diced and cooked in soy sauce and other seasonings including garlic. The chicken meat might also be cooked with mushrooms.

The seasoned chicken and mushroom mixture is placed on the noodles, and topped with chopped spring onions (green shallots). Bakmi ayam is usually served with a separate chicken broth, boiled chinese cabbage, and often wonton  either crispy fried or in soup, and also bakso (meatballs). While Chinese variants might use pork fat or lard, the more common Indonesian mie ayam uses halal chicken fat or vegetable oil to cater to Muslim eaters.

Additional condiments might include tong cay (salted preserved vegetables), bawang goreng (fried shallots), daun bawang (leek), kulit pangsit goreng (fried dumpling skin), acar timun cabe rawit (pickled cucumber and birds eye chilli), sambal and tomato ketchup.

Variants 

In Indonesia, the name is shortened to mie ayam or mi ayam. In Indonesia chicken noodles are often seasoned with soy sauce and chicken oil, made from chicken fat and spices mixture (clove, white pepper, ginger, and coriander), and usually served with a chicken broth soup.

Flavour variants 
Mie ayam "chicken noodle" can be served in two different flavour variants; the common salty and the sweet noodle. 
Mie ayam biasa or mie asin common salty mie ayam, which are the common savoury or salty noodle which uses salty soy sauce and chicken oil.
Mie yamin or mie manis is the sweet variant. For the sweet noodle, the cook will put additional sweet soy sauce kecap manis, so the appearance will be a little bit brownish.

Regional variants 

There are variants of mie ayam based on the region, such as:
Bangka-style mie ayam
Jakarta ayam kampung-style mie ayam
Wonogiri-style mie ayam

Noodles colour variants 

A relatively recent creation is the colourful mie ayam. It uses additional ingredients mixed into noodle dough that alter the noodle into distinct unusual colour.
Green noodles mie ayam; the noodle is coloured with spinach.
Black noodles mie ayam; the noodle is coloured with squid's ink or charcoal.
Red noodles mie ayam; the noodle is coloured with beetroot.
Purple noodles mie ayam; the noodle is coloured with taro.

Noodles substitute variants 
Other types of noodles such as bihun (rice vermicelli) and kwetiau (flat noodle) might be served in the same recipe instead of the bakmi. Kwetiau ayam (chicken kway teow) and bihun ayam (chicken bihun) refer to almost exactly the same recipe with mie ayam by replacing yellow wheat noodle with flat noodle or rice vermicelli.

See also

 Mie goreng
 Kwetiau goreng
 List of chicken dishes

References

Indonesian Chinese cuisine
Indonesian noodle dishes
Indonesian chicken dishes
Street food in Indonesia